The voiceless glottal fricative, sometimes called voiceless glottal transition, and sometimes called the aspirate, is a type of sound used in some spoken languages that patterns like a fricative or approximant consonant phonologically, but often lacks the usual phonetic characteristics of a consonant.

Lamé contrasts voiceless and voiced glottal fricatives.

Features
Features of the "voiceless glottal fricative":

 In some languages, it has the constricted manner of articulation of a fricative. However, in many if not most it is a transitional state of the glottis, with no manner of articulation other than its phonation type. Because there is no other constriction to produce friction in the vocal tract in the languages they are familiar with, many phoneticians no longer consider  to be a fricative. However, the term "fricative" is generally retained for historical reasons.
 It may have a glottal place of articulation. However, it may have no fricative articulation, in which case the term 'glottal' only refers to the nature of its phonation, and does not describe the location of the stricture nor the turbulence. All consonants except for the glottals, and all vowels, have an individual place of articulation in addition to the state of the glottis. As with all other consonants, surrounding vowels influence the pronunciation , and  has sometimes been presented as a voiceless vowel, having the place of articulation of these surrounding vowels.

Occurrence

See also
 Voiced glottal fricative
 Voiceless nasal glottal fricative
 Index of phonetics articles

Notes

References

External links
 

Glottal consonants
Approximant-fricative consonants
Pulmonic consonants
Voiceless oral consonants